The Smithies Peak, sometimes incorrectly called Smithies Towers, is a mountain in the Central Highlands region of Tasmania, Australia.  The mountain is situated in the Cradle Mountain-Lake St Clair National Park.

The peak is composed of dolerite columns, similar to many of the other mountains in the area and rises above the glacially formed Dove Lake, Lake Wilks and Crater Lake.

Cradle Mountain has four named summits. In order of height they are Cradle Mountain; Smithies Peak; Weindorfers Tower; and Little Horn.

See also

 Cradle Mountain-Lake St Clair National Park
 List of highest mountains of Tasmania

References

External links 
 Tasmanian Parks and Wildlife Page
 Photojournal covering Cradle Mountain as part of The Overland Track
 Cradle Mountain Tourist Attraction
 Parks and Wildlife Service Webcams

Central Highlands (Tasmania)
Mountains of Tasmania
Cradle Mountain-Lake St Clair National Park